Assembler may refer to:

Arts and media
 Nobukazu Takemura, avant-garde electronic musician, stage name Assembler
 Assemblers, a fictional race in the Star Wars universe
 Assemblers, an alternative name of the superhero group Champions of Angor

Biology 
Assembler (bioinformatics), a program to perform genome assembly
Assembler (nanotechnology), a conjectured construction machine that would manipulate and build with individual atoms or molecules

Computing 
Assembler (computing), a computer program which translates assembly language to machine language
Assembly language, a more readable interpretation of a processor's machine code, allowing easier understanding and programming by humans, sometimes erroneously referenced as 'assembler' after the program which translates it

Other uses
 a worker on an assembly line

See also
 Assemble (disambiguation)
 Assembly (disambiguation)
 Constructor (disambiguation)